Lake Deaton is a lake in Wildwood, Florida, United States. Lake Deaton Park is located on its shore. In 2019 improved amenities and a pier were planned as part of an improvement project to accommodate dragon boat racers from The Villages community. The lake is on the north side of State Road 44. Lake Okahumpka is on the south side of the road. In 1980, the United States Geological Survey reported on the areas hydrology including the two lakes.

References

Bodies of water of Sumter County, Florida
Deaton